Apple TV+ is a global on-demand Internet streaming media provider, owned and operated by Apple Inc., that features a number of original programs that includes original series, specials, miniseries, documentaries, and films distributed under Apple Original Films.

Original films

Feature films

Documentaries

Specials

Upcoming original films

Feature films

Documentaries

In development

Notes

References

External links
  – official site

 
Apple TV+
Apple TV+